Kheyrabad (also Romanized as Kheyrābād) is a village in Abnama Rural District, in the Central District of Rudan County, Hormozgan Province, Iran. At the 2006 census, its population was 2,318, in 493 families.

References 

Populated places in Rudan County